The Guy Peaks are a cluster of peaks located  northeast of Mount Borgeson, overlooking Peale Inlet on Thurston Island, Antarctica. They were mapped from air photos made by U.S. Navy Operation Highjump in December 1946 and were named by the Advisory Committee on Antarctic Names for Arthur W. Guy, an electrical engineer at Byrd Station, 1964–65.

See also
 Mountains in Antarctica

Maps
 Thurston Island – Jones Mountains. 1:500000 Antarctica Sketch Map. US Geological Survey, 1967.
 Antarctic Digital Database (ADD). Scale 1:250000 topographic map of Antarctica. Scientific Committee on Antarctic Research (SCAR). Since 1993, regularly upgraded and updated.

References

Mountains of Ellsworth Land